Buncrana Hearts F.C. is an association football club based in the Inishowen peninsula, County Donegal, that play in the Inishowen Football League. They play in Castle Park in Buncrana. The club was founded in 1961.

Castle Park
Castle Park, the home ground of Buncrana Hearts, is based at The Buncrana Youth Club. This has been Buncrana Hearts's home since the 1970s. It has two full-size pitches, one training pitch, two Astroturf pitches, indoor pitch and excellent changing facilities.

Underage development
Buncrana Hearts' underage structure in recent times has been extremely successful Thanks to John Mc Grory who was the brains behind the youth set up, producing teams that have won all competitions they have played in the past 20 years. Individual progression has also been excellent in recent times with players progressing to higher levels. Since 2007, the club has had several players go on trial with professional clubs in England.

The club has had several players go on to play for Republic of Ireland at various levels, including Kieran McDaid, Aaron McDaid, Mark McFadden, Jonathan Bonner, Conor O'Donnell, Mark Timlin and Seanán Murphy.

Former players currently playing in the League of Ireland include Mark Timlin (Finn Harps) and Mark McFadden (Derry City FC), with other recent graduates including Jonathan Bonner (Finn Harps, Wexford Youths, Crusaders FC), Conor O'Donnell (UCD AFC, Limerick FC), Colm McLaughlin (Ballinamallard, Institute FC), Kieran McDaid (Finn Harps, Republic of Ireland Amateurs captain) and Rory Kelly (Institute FC, Finn Harps, Derry City FC).

Buncrana Hearts has also produced several prominent women's players in recent years, most notably Leah McDaid (Life University & Northern Ireland international) and Emma Doherty (Republic of Ireland international). Beckie Temple from fergleen park finished the 2022 season top goal scorer with 102 goals in the league. She went on to sign for Leeds united.

1993 Ulster Senior League and Buncrana Cup double-winning side
Buncrana Hearts won the Ulster Senior League and Buncrana Cup double for the first time in 1992/1993. F.A.I. Development Officer Stephen McNutt was player-manager and was assisted by Sean Murphy with Derek Smith team captain. Player of the Year was Shane Byrne with Top Goalscorer going to John Coyle.
The team continued its success the following season narrowly missing out on retaining the title after losing a play-off and by becoming the first winners of the Ulster Senior Cup defeating Letterkenny Rovers in the final.

Associated clubs
In the last few years, Buncrana Hearts have developed a relationship with Derry City in the League of Ireland, and English Championship side Preston North End. This has seen several players join these clubs, either on trial or on a permanent basis.

References 

Buncrana
Association football clubs in County Donegal
Ulster Senior League (association football) teams